The Eastern Anatolia Region is a geographical region of Turkey. The most populous province in the region is Van Province. Other populous provinces are Malatya, Erzurum and Elazığ.

It is bordered by the Black Sea Region and Georgia in the north, the Central Anatolia Region in the west, the Mediterranean Region in the southeast, the Southeastern Anatolia Region and Iraq in the south, and Iran, Azerbaijan and Armenia in the east.

The region encompasses most of Western Armenia and had a large population of indigenous Armenians until the Armenian genocide. The Anatolia peninsula never encompassed what is now called "Eastern Anatolia", which has been seen as an attempt by Turkey to erase the Armenian history of the region.

It has the highest average altitude, largest geographical area, and lowest population density of the seven Turkish regions.

Substitution for the name Armenia 

Beginning in 1880, the name Armenia was forbidden to be used in official documents of the Ottoman Empire, in an attempt to play down the history of Armenians in their own homeland. The government of Sultan Abdul Hamid II replaced the name Armenia with such terms as "Kurdistan" or "Anatolia". The Sublime Porte believed there would be no Armenian question if there was no Armenia. The process of “nationalization” of toponyms was continued and gained momentum under the Kemalists after the foundation of the Republic of Turkey. In 1923, the entire territory of Western Armenia was officially renamed "Eastern Anatolia" (literally 'Eastern East').

The word Anatolia means 'sunrise' or 'east' in Greek. This name was given to the Asia Minor peninsula approximately in the 5th or 4th centuries B.C. Numerous European, Ottoman, Armenian, Russian, Persian, Arabic and other primary sources made clear distinctions between Anatolia and Armenia. The Armenian Highlands have historically been considered to be east of Anatolia, with the border between them located near Sivas (Sebastia) and Kayseri (Caesarea).

In the 17th century the terms "Anatolia" or "Eastern Anatolia" were never used to indicate Armenia. The Islamic world map of the 16th century and other Ottoman maps of the 18th and 19th centuries also indicate Armenia (Ermenistan) in a specific territory, as well as its cities.

Armenia, together with its boundaries, was mentioned in the works of Ottoman historians and chroniclers until the ban at the end of the 19th century. Kâtip Çelebi, a famous Ottoman chronicler of the 17th century, had a special chapter titled “About the Country Called Armenia” in his book Jihan Numa. However, when this book was republished in 1957, its modern Turkish editor H. Selen changed this title into “Eastern Anatolia”. Osman Nuri, a historian of the second half of the 19th century, mentions Armenia repeatedly in his three-volume Abdul Hamid and the Period of His Reign.

Subdivision 
Eastern Anatolia Region has four subdivisions:
 Upper Euphrates division
 Erzurum-Kars division
 Upper Murat-Van division
 Hakkari division

Provinces 

Provinces that are entirely in the Eastern Anatolia Region:

 Ağrı
 Bingöl
 Elazığ
 Malatya
 Hakkari
 Iğdır
 Kars
 Tunceli
 Van

Provinces that are mostly in the Eastern Anatolia Region:

 Ardahan
 Erzurum
 Şırnak

Location and borders
The Eastern Anatolia Region is located in the easternmost part of Turkey. It is bounded by Turkey's Central Anatolia Region to the west; Turkey's Black Sea Region to the north; Turkey's Southeast Anatolia Region and Iraq to the south; and Iran, Azerbaijan, Armenia and Georgia to the east, where Eastern Anatolia overlaps and converges with the South Caucasus region and Lesser Caucasus mountain plateau.

Population
The total population of the region is 5,966,101 (2019 estimate), down from 6,100,000 at the 2000 census. The population density is lower than the average for Turkey. The region has the second most rural population in Turkey after the Black Sea region. Migration, especially to Marmara Region, is high. Migration to other regions and abroad is higher than the natural population increase. Until the Armenian genocide, the region also had a large population of indigenous Armenians, when it was also known as Western Armenia, and in addition had significant minorities of Georgians, Pontic Greeks and Caucasus Greeks.

Geography
Major geographic features include plains, plateaus and massifs. There is some volcanic activity today.

Lakes And Rivers

 Located in the Eastern Anatolia Region Aras and Kura rivers flooded the shed outside the territory of Turkey to the Caspian Sea. Euphrates, the Tigris and the Zab river waters are poured back onto the Persian Gulf Turkey outside.
 The regime of the streams of the region is irregular. This is because; the irregularity of the precipitation regime and the fall of winter precipitation in the form of snow. As the snow falls on the ground for a long time without melting, the flow rates of the rivers decrease. The snow melting in spring and summer causes streams to increase their flow rates and flow enthusiastically. On the other hand, the rivers of the region have high hydroelectric energy potential. The reason for this is that it has high elevations and slopes.
 Lakes were formed on the fault lines throughout the region. Turkey's largest lake, Lake Van along with Lake Çıldır, Lake Nazik, Lake Erçek, Lake Hazar, Lake Balık and Lake Haçlı are located within the region.

Massifs and mountains
There are three massif lines running north–south:
To the north, the Çimen Dağı, Kop Dağı and Yalnızçam mountains
In the centre, the Munzur, Karasu Dağı, Aras Dağı mountains
To the south, Southeast Tauros, Bitlis, Hakkâri, and Buzul mountains.
The volcanic mountains Nemrut, Süphan, Tendürek and Ararat are in the region.

Plateaus and plains
The largest plateau in the region is Erzurum-Kars Plato.
The region includes the Malatya, Elazığ, Bingöl, Muş plains and the Van Lake basin.

Lakes

Rivers

Climate and nature

Since most of the region is far from the sea, and has high altitude, it has a harsh continental climate with long winters and short summers. During the winter, it is very cold and snowy, during summer the weather is cool in the highlands and warm in the lowlands.

The region's annual temperature difference is the highest in Turkey. Some areas in the region have different microclimates. As an example, Iğdır (near Mount Ararat) has a milder climate.

The region contains 11% percent of the total forested area of Turkey, and it is rich in native plants and animals. Oak and yellow pine trees form the majority of the forests.

The region has high potential for hydroelectric power.

Gallery

Endnotes

External links

 
Regions of Turkey
Geographic history of Armenia